The Bishop of Moray or Bishop of Elgin was the ecclesiastical head of the Diocese of Moray in northern Scotland, one of Scotland's 13 medieval bishoprics. If the foundation charter of the monastery at Scone is reliable, then the Bishopric of Moray was in existence as early as the reign of King Alexander I of Scotland (1107–1124), but was certainly in existence by 1127, when one Gregoir ("Gregorius") is mentioned as "Bishop of Moray" in a charter of king David I of Scotland. The bishopric had its seat at Elgin and Elgin Cathedral, but was severally at Birnie, Kinneddar and as late as Bishop Andreas de Moravia at Spynie, where the bishops continued to maintain a palace.  The Bishopric's links with Rome ceased to exist after the Scottish Reformation, but continued, saving temporary abolition between 1638 and 1661, under the episcopal Church of Scotland until the Revolution of 1688. Episcopacy in the established church in Scotland was permanently abolished in 1689. The Bishops fortified seat for over 500 years was at Spynie Palace.

List of known bishops of Moray

References
 Dowden, John, The Bishops of Scotland, ed. J. Maitland Thomson, (Glasgow, 1912)
 Keith, Robert, An Historical Catalogue of the Scottish Bishops: Down to the Year 1688, (London, 1924)
 Lawrie, Sir Archibald, Early Scottish Charters Prior to A.D. 1153, (Glasgow, 1905)
 Watt, D.E.R., Fasti Ecclesiae Scotinanae Medii Aevi ad annum 1638, 2nd Draft, (St Andrews, 1969)

External links
 Jackson, Kenneth H. (ed), The Gaelic Notes in the Book of Deer, (Cambridge, 1972)
Dauvit Broun's list of 12th century Scottish Bishops

 
Bisop of Moray
12th-century establishments in Scotland
1688 disestablishments in Scotland